, also known as , is a Japanese voice actress from Tokyo, Japan. On April 30, 2010, she announced that she will not be voice acting anymore. However, on April 16, 2013, she announced that she resumed her voice acting career on her blog.

Anime cast in
Demonbane as Ennea
Happiness! as Anri Hiiragi
H2O: Footprints in the Sand as Otoha
Moekan as Rinia
In Search of the Lost Future as Neko Yamaga
Crescent Love as Mia Clementis
Shukufuku no Campanella as Salsa Tortilla

Video games
Clover Heart's: Looking for Happiness as Airi Momose
Nekopara as Azuki
"Pastel" as Yukino Kusanagi
Wonderful Everyday as Otonashi Ayana

External links
Mia Naruse's personal website 

Japanese voice actresses
Living people
Year of birth missing (living people)